Jack Creek, Jacks Creek, or Jack's Creek may refer to:

Populated places
In the United States

Jack Creek Township, Emmet County, Iowa
Jacks Creek, Kentucky, an unincorporated community in Floyd County
Jack Creek, Nevada, an unincorporated community
Jacks Creek, Tennessee, an unincorporated community in Chester County

Waterways
In the United States
Jack Creek (Florida), a water conservation area and park in Highlands County
Jacks Creek (Apalachee River tributary), a stream in Walton County, Georgia
Jacks Creek (Bruneau River), a stream in Idaho
Jack Creek (Des Moines River), a river in Minnesota
Jack Creek (Buck Creek), a river in Missouri
Jack Creek (Nevada), a stream in Nevada
Jacks Creek (Pennsylvania), a tributary of the Juniata River
Jack Creek (South Dakota), a stream in South Dakota

Elsewhere
Jack Creek (Nipissing District), in Nipissing District, Ontario, Canada

Other
Jack's Creek Covered Bridge, Patrick County, Virginia
Jacks Creek (album), an album by Sun City Girls

See also
Big Jacks Creek, a stream in Idaho